Pennsylvania's state elections were held on November 5, 2002. Necessary primary elections were held on May 21, 2002.

Governor

US House of Representatives

State Senate

State House

Ballot Question

References

See also

 
Pennsylvania